George Bertram Landenberger (May 12, 1879 – January 15, 1936) was a United States Navy Captain and the governor of American Samoa, from May 12, 1932, to April 10, 1934. Landenberger commanded many ships during his naval career, as well as two naval yards. He received the Navy Cross for his actions commanding  during World War I. He died of cancer in 1936, one year after retiring from military service.

Life

Early life
Landenberger was born in Philadelphia, Pennsylvania, on May 12, 1879.

Naval career
Landenberger attended the United States Naval Academy from Germantown, Philadelphia, Pennsylvania, on May 10, 1896, graduating in 1900. As an ensign, he joined the United States Asiatic Fleet, eventually joining forces in the Philippines. Landenberger served on  during 1906.

Landenberger received the Navy Cross for his service as commanding officer of  during the First World War. The citation read: "The Navy Cross is awarded to Captain George Landenberger, U.S. Navy, for exceptionally meritorious service in a duty of great responsibility as commanding officer of the U.S.S. Indiana, in the Atlantic Fleet."

Right before becoming the governor of American Samoa, Landenberger was in the post of Chief of Staff of the 15th Naval District in the Panama Canal Zone. This followed an appointment to the command of the Naval Station on Goat Island.  After serving as governor, he was reassigned as head of the Philadelphia Naval Shipyard.

Later life
Landenberger retired from service in 1935 to Haverford, Pennsylvania. December 10 of that year, Landenberger underwent treatment for lung problems, receiving several blood transfusions. He died on January 15, 1936, of sarcoma of the chest. He died at the Naval Hospital in Philadelphia.

Governorship
Landenberger became Governor of American Samoa on May 12, 1932, succeeding Gatewood Lincoln. He served until April 10, 1934.

References

1879 births
1936 deaths
Governors of American Samoa
United States Navy officers
Military personnel from Philadelphia
Recipients of the Navy Cross (United States)
United States Naval Academy alumni
United States Navy personnel of World War I
Deaths from cancer in Pennsylvania